McLaughlin is a hamlet in central Alberta, Canada within the County of Vermilion River.

Demographics 
The population of McLaughlin according to the 2015 municipal census conducted by the County of Vermilion River is 41.

See also 
List of communities in Alberta
List of hamlets in Alberta

References 

Hamlets in Alberta
County of Vermilion River